Clodagh Rodgers (born 5 March 1947) is a retired singer and actress from Northern Ireland, best known for her hit singles including "Come Back and Shake Me", "Goodnight Midnight", and "Jack in the Box".

Career
Rodgers was born in Warrenpoint and began her professional singing career at 13 when she opened for Michael Holliday. Her father, a dancehall tour promoter, helped her sign with Decca in 1962, where her earliest singles were produced by Shel Talmy. Her UK TV debut came on 26 September 1962, appearing as a guest on BBC TV's Adam Faith Show performing Let's Jump the Broomstick. She made four singles with Decca, before moving to EMI's Columbia label in 1965, where 'Cloda Rogers' made the 1966 single "Stormy Weather"/"Lonely Room". Although none of her Decca or Columbia singles made the UK Singles Chart, Rodgers became a regular face on British television and appeared in the musical films Just for Fun (1963) and It's All Over Town (1964). She also appeared in various song festivals, finishing third in the European Song Cup competition in Greece with  "Powder Your Face With Sunshine". In November 1963 she flew to Nashville, Tennessee at the invitation of the American singer Jim Reeves, to perform at the Grand Ole Opry. On his Irish tour earlier that year he had recognised that Rodgers was a promising artist with a bright future.

Rodgers appeared with Honeybus on BBC Two's music programme Colour Me Pop on 12 October, 1968. Her career changed dramatically when she married John Morris, who became her manager. She signed a three-single deal with RCA in 1968, but the first two failed to chart. When producer and songwriter Kenny Young saw her on Colour Me Pop he telephoned the BBC to find out who she was. Clodagh Rodgers finally shot to chart success in 1969 under his creative wing and with Morris' management (Morris also later managed The Rubettes, Kenny and Fox), "Come Back and Shake Me" and "Goodnight Midnight" both were Top 5 hits and made her the best-selling female singles artist of 1969. The same year, she won 'The Best Legs' in British showbusiness and insured her voice for one million pounds. Her next two single releases "Biljo" and "Everybody Go Home, The Party's Over", were less successful. Neither broke the top 20 and the latter failed to reach the top 40. Her next single, "Tangerines, Tangerines" in January 1970 didn't chart at all, despite heavy television promotion on such highly popular shows as The Morecambe & Wise Show, Frost On Sunday and The Des O'Connor Show. The single was re-released in April 1970 with the B-Side track "Wolf" promoted as the A-Side, but it still failed to chart.

Young wrote and produced many of these songs. She also recorded "Scrapbook," penned by Billy Ritchie, which appeared on her 1969 album Midnight Clodagh. In 1970 she recorded "Give Me Just a Little More Line" with Young under the name Moonshine; though it achieved airplay and critical notice, it failed to chart. Rodgers picked this track as one of her eight favourite discs when she appeared as the featured castaway on the BBC's Desert Island Discs in March 1971. In May 1970 Rodgers appeared on the bill at the NME poll-winner's concert, hosted by Tony Blackburn and Jimmy Savile.

Eurovision
By this time Rodgers had become a TV star and household name. In 1970 she was asked to represent the UK in the 1971 Eurovision Song Contest in Dublin. According to John Kennedy O'Connor's The Eurovision Song Contest – The Official History, part of the reasoning behind the BBC's invitation was their concern over the reaction the UK entrant would get on the stage from the Irish public. As a Catholic Northern Irishwoman, she received death threats from the IRA, who regarded her as a traitor, as a result of her appearing for the UK.

Heralded by two separate front-cover features on the BBC listing's magazine, the Radio Times, Rodgers appeared as the resident guest on It's Cliff Richard, a prime-time variety show hosted by Cliff Richard on BBC One from January 1971, performing one shortlisted song a week for six weeks, followed by a performance of all six on week seven and with a repeat of the six songs immediately after. Viewers would normally have been asked to send in postcard votes for their favourites, but because of a postal strike, regional juries decided the winner, with "Jack in the Box", written by John Worsley and David Myers, being named the winner the following week.

For the first time in the Eurovision Song Contest, broadcasters were required to prepare a 'preview' video of the song for broadcast in all the participating Eurovision countries to help promote the songs before the big night. For the performance in Dublin, Rodgers wore a pink frilly top and spangled hot pants. She finished in fourth place, behind Monaco, Spain and Germany. It was the first time since 1966 that the UK had not placed first or second. After Eurovision, the single reached number 4 on the UK Singles Chart, her third and last UK Top 10 success. It remains her most famous hit.

At Eurovision, Rodgers' sister Lavinia joined The Breakaways as her four backing vocalists. In 1982, Lavinia and brother Louis attempted to represent the UK in the contest with 'Every Day of My Life' as part of the group 'Good Looks', but finished second to Bardo in A Song For Europe.

Post-Eurovision career
Rodgers admitted to Ken Bruce during his eponymous BBC Radio 2 show in an interview broadcast on Friday, 25 May 2012, that the intention had been to release "Another Time, Another Place", which had placed fourth of the six entries in the Song for Europe contest as the follow-up single to "Jack in the Box" and she began promoting it whilst in Dublin for the Eurovision final. However, Engelbert Humperdinck released a cover version before her track was available, denying her the opportunity to release it, but gaining himself a No.13 hit single. Despite only one more chart single, "Lady Love Bug" in autumn 1971, Rodgers continued to be a major TV star in the UK, guesting on many shows (including playing herself in the BBC sitcom Whack-O!), appearing in cabaret, and becoming the face of 'Bisto' in a series of television advertisements. On Irish television, The Clodagh Rodgers Show won an award at the Golden Rose TV festival in Montreux. She starred in many other shows, including Sunday Night at the London Palladium in 1974, singing three songs, including her latest single "Get It Together". Rodgers also appeared in Seaside Special for BBC Television in 1975 and The Morecambe and Wise Show in 1970. She was a regular guest of The Two Ronnies. In August 1973, Rodgers hosted the first edition of BBC2's Show Of The Week: The Young Generation Big Top, the forerunner of the later BBC1 series Seaside Special.

Rodgers also made a mark with her impressions of fellow artists such as Cilla Black, often working with Mike Yarwood, Des O'Connor, Tommy Cooper, Bob Monkhouse, and Dickie Henderson in variety. She was a regular performer in UK resorts' summer seasons, sharing the bill with Mike and Bernie Winters, among others. This success was mirrored on stage, where she has starred in London's West End in her own show at the Talk of the Town (breaking Sammy Davis Jr.'s box office record) and in Cinderella at the London Palladium in 1971.

Her stage career was damaged when she walked out on the show Meet Me in London at London's Adelphi Theatre in April 1971. The show, a fixed 10-week fill-in between the closure of the musical Charlie Girl and a new production of Show Boat, was produced by Harold Fielding, and consisted of two halves. Clodagh was due to feature in the opening half, mainly with the 30-strong singing and dancing group, The Young Generation, with two interspersed spots, one with comics Hope and Keen, the other some songs from Rodgers. The second half was a Tommy Steele-centred spectacular that had originally been played in Las Vegas. After cuts to the running order to trim the show's length, Rodgers and her manager/husband walked out 15 minutes before curtain-up on opening night. Hope and Keen filled in for her and after a few shows singer Susan Maughan took over her spot. Despite this, Rodgers continued with TV work through the late 1970s. As part of BBC1's celebration of the UK and Ireland both joining the European Economic Community on 1 January 1973, Clodagh appeared on Top Of The Year on 31 December 1972, alongside Bruce Forsyth and with Jimmy Tarbuck in The Tarbuck Follies on 1 January 1973 to see in the new year. Having been dropped by RCA in early 1974, Clodagh released just one single for the Pye label, "Saturday Sunday" later that year. She signed to Polydor Records in 1976. Despite extensive radio airplay and television appearances, her 1977 single "Save Me" failed to chart. The track was covered in the US by Louise Mandrell who took it to number six on the US country chart in 1983. "Save Me" was also covered by the South African all-female band Clout (an SA no. 7 hit in 1979). Other artists who covered this song include Merrilee Rush and Helen Reddy. The failure of the Polydor album or any of the singles issued from it to reach the UK charts led to the label dropping her in 1978.

In 1978, Rodgers hosted UK ITV's St. Patrick's Day variety show for the first time, appearing on the cover of the TVTimes to promote the show and at the same time was confirmed as the host for the 1979 show. Later in 1978, Rodgers teamed with Terry Wogan on the ITV game show 3-2-1 in the programme's first Christmas Special Celebrity edition, and the pair became the first contestants (celebrity or otherwise) to end up with the 'Dustbin' as their prize, losing the chance to attain a prize for their nominated charity. She split from her manager/husband not long after their son's birth and opted for motherhood over performing, although she released two singles on the Precision label in 1980. One of these tracks was "My Simple Heart," which was placed on a B-side. Shortly after its release, The Three Degrees released their version of it, which reached the UK Top 10. Similarly, Rodgers had released "Stand by Your Man" as the B-side of her 1971 single "Lady Love Bug." "Stand by Your Man" (co-written by Tammy Wynette and Billy Sherrill) had previously been a hit for Tammy Wynette in the U.S. Country charts in 1968 and later a number one hit single for Wynette when it was released the UK in 1975.

Later years
Her second husband, guitarist Ian Sorbie, died in 1995, not long after their Paignton-based restaurant business collapsed, leaving them bankrupt.

She has appeared in two musicals in the West End. These are Pump Boys and Dinettes at the Piccadilly and Albery Theatres and in the lead role of Mrs Johnstone in the long-running hit Blood Brothers at the Phoenix Theatre. She appeared in the UK tour of Blood Brothers between 1995 and 1998. 

In 1996, the first of two CD retrospectives was issued, bringing Rodgers back into the limelight. In 1998, she made a rare TV appearance with other former Eurovision artists such as Johnny Logan and Lynsey de Paul, performing on comedian John Shuttleworth's Eurovision parody Europigeon on BBC Two, just before the 1998 contest in Birmingham.

In 1999, Mint Royale issued the track "Shake Me," which sampled Rodgers' original recording of "Come Back And Shake Me"; it was featured in the UK TV production Queer As Folk. In 2001, Rodgers played a recurring character in the ITV drama series The Bill. She retired from the music business in 2015 at the age of 68.

Other
In the TV series Monty Python's Flying Circus, Episode 34: "The Cycling Tour", Mr. Gulliver (Terry Jones) receives a head trauma from an auto accident and is convinced that he is Clodagh Rodgers. At the end of the episode, two large Terry Gilliam-animated monsters, who had been eyeing the cyclist lead character Mr. Pither (Michael Palin) from behind a bush, wait until Pither is gone, jump out, and dance up and down to Rodgers' rendition of "Jack in the Box".

Discography

Albums
 1969 Clodagh Rodgers – (RCA SF8033) – UK Number 27
 1969 Midnight Clodagh – (RCA SF8071)
 1971 Rodgers and Heart – (RCA Victor SF8180)
 1972 It's Different Now – (RCA SF8271)
 1973 You Are My Music – (RCA SF8394)
 1977 Save Me – (Polydor Super 2383473)

Compilations
 1971 Clodagh Rodgers (Compilation) – (RCA Camden CDS1094)
 1973 Come Back and Shake Me (Compilation) – (RCA International 1434)
 1996 You Are My Music – The Best of Clodagh Rodgers (Compilation CD) – (BMG Camden BM830)
 1997 The Masters (Compilation CD) – (Eagle EACD076)
 2012 Come Back & Shake Me: The Kenny Young Years 1969–71 (Compilation CD) – (RPM B006TX26SG)

Singles
 1962 "Believe Me I'm No Fool" / "End of the Line" (Decca F11534) [Produced by Shel Talmy]
 1963 "Sometime Kind of Love" / "I See More of Him" (Decca F11607)
 1963 "To Give My Love to You" / "I Only Live to Love You" (Decca F11667)
 1964 "Mister Heartache" / "Time" (Decca F11812)
 1965 "Wanting You" / "Johnny Come Home" (Columbia DB7468)
 1966 "Every Day Is Just the Same" / "You'll Come a Running" (Columbia DB7926)
 1966 "Stormy Weather" / "Lonely Room" (Columbia DB8038)
 1968 "Room Full of Roses" / "Play the Drama to the End" (RCA 1684)
 1968 "Rhythm of Love" / "River of Tears" (RCA 1748)
 1969 "Come Back and Shake Me" / "I Am a Fantasy" (RCA 1792) – UK Number 3
 1969 "Goodnight Midnight" / "Together" (RCA 1852) UK Number 4
 1969 "Biljo" / "Spider" (RCA 1891) UK Number 22, AUS Number 76
 1970 "Everybody Go Home the Party's Over" / "Joseph I'm Calling You" (RCA 1930) UK Number 47
 1970 "Give Me Just a Little More Line" / "I Am the Tail" (RCA 1954) (duet with Kenny Young credited as 'Moonshine')
 1970 "Tangerines, Tangerines" / "Wolf" (RCA 1966)~
 1971 "Jack in the Box" / "Someone to Love Me" (RCA 2066)~~ UK Number 4, AUS Number 67
 1971 "Lady Love Bug" / "Stand by Your Man" (RCA 2117) UK Number 28, AUS Number 68
 1972 "It's Different Now" / "Take Me Home" (RCA 2192)
 1972 "You Are My Music" / "One Day" (RCA 2298)
 1973 "Carolina Days" / "Loving You" (RCA 2355)
 1973 "That's the Way I've Always Heard It Should Be" (RCA 5248)
 1974 "Get It Together" / "Take Me Home" (RCA 5008)
 1974 "Saturday Sunday" / "Love Is" (PYE 7N 45387)
 1977 "Save Me" / "Sleepyhead" (Polydor 2058804)
 1977 "Put It Back Together" / "Lay Me Down" (Polydor 2058887)
 1977 "Incident at the Roxy" (Polydor 2058864)
 1977 "Loving Cup" / "Morning Comes Quickly" (Polydor 2058934)
 1978 "Love Is Deep Inside of Me" / "Candlelight" (Polydor 2058997)
 1980 "I Can't Afford That Feeling Anymore" / "My Simple Heart" (Precision 109)
 1980 "Person to Person" / "My Simple Heart" (Precision 119)
 1999 "Shake Me" (Mint Royale ft. Clodagh Rodgers) (FHCD010)
~ "Tangerines, Tangerines" was originally released as the A-side of the single in January 1970, but when it failed to chart, the single was re-issued with B-side "Wolf" as the lead track in April 1970.
~~ Three singles of Jack In The Box were issued under catalogue no. RCA 2066. The first had the 'B' Side Someone To Love Me; the second had the 'B' Side Wind of Change; the third had both tracks on the 'B' side and was a 33.3 RPM Maxi Single.

UK television appearances

1960s
 26 September 1962 – BBCtv: Adam Faith Show
 10 November 1962 – BBCtv: Adam Faith Show
 3 January 1963 – BBCtv: Like... Music
 26 February 1963 – BBCtv: The 625 Show
 11 June 1963 – BBCtv: The 625 Show
 22 June 1963 – ITV: Thank Your Lucky Stars
 18 February 1964 – ITV: The Five O'Clock Club
 12 October 1968 – BBC2: Colour Me Pop
 20 February 1969 – ITV: Walk Right In
 26 February 1969 – ITV: Discotheque
 17 March 1969 – BBC1: Dee Time
 10 April 1969 – BBC1: Top Of The Pops
 17 April 1969 – BBC1: Top Of The Pops
 24 April 1969 – BBC1: Top Of The Pops
 8 May 1969 – BBC1: Top Of The Pops
 31 May 1969 – ITV: Set 'Em Up Joe
 30 June 1969 – ITV: Mike & Bernie's Show
 3 July 1969 – BBC1: Top Of The Pops
 5 July 1969 – BBC1: The Roy Castle Show
 6 July 1969 – ITV: The Golden Shot
 12 July 1969 – ITV: Set 'Em Up Joe
 17 July 1969 – BBC1: Top Of The Pops
 24 July 1969 – BBC1: Top Of The Pops
 26 July 1969 – BBC1: Dee Time
 7 August 1969 – BBC1: Top Of The Pops
 24 August 1969 – ITV: The Golden Shot
 25 October 1969 – ITV: Frost On Saturday
 30 October 1969 – BBC1: Top Of The Pops
 16 November 1969 – ITV: The Golden Shot
 25 December 1969 – BBC1: Top Of The Pops Christmas Special

1970s
 3 January 1970 – BBC2: Colour Me Pop
 17 January 1970 – BBC1: The Val Doonican Show
 1 March 1970 – ITV: Frost On Sunday
 14 March 1970 – BBC2: Disco 2
 25 March 1970 – BBC2: Show Of The Week – The Morecambe And Wise Show
 8 June 1970 – ITV: Mike And Bernie's Scene
 11 June 1970 – BBC1: Top Of The Pops
 13 June 1970 – BBC1: The Roy Castle Show
 14 June 1970 – ITV: Stars On Sunday
 4 July 1970 – BBC2: The Val Doonican Show (repeat from BBC1)
 4 July 1970 – ITV: The Des O’Connor Show
 19 July 1970 – ITV: The Golden Shot
 16 August 1970 – ITV: Joe (The Joe Brown Show)
 22 August 1970 – BBC1: It's Lulu
 5 September 1970 – ITV: Maggie's Place
 10 October 1970 – BBC1: The Harry Secombe Show
 29 October 1970 – BBC1: The Morecambe And Wise Show (repeat from BBC2)
 12 December 1970 – ATV: It's Tarbuck
 25 December 1970 – BBC1: Christmas Night With The Stars
 9 January 1971 – BBC1: It's Cliff Richard
 16 January 1971 – BBC1: It's Cliff Richard
 23 January 1971 – BBC1: It's Cliff Richard
 30 January 1971 – BBC1: It's Cliff Richard
 6 February 1971 – BBC1: It's Cliff Richard
 13 February 1971 – BBC1: It's Cliff Richard
 20 February 1971 – BBC1: It's Cliff Richard (A Song for Europe 1971)
 27 February 1971 – BBC1: It's Cliff Richard
 27 March 1971 – BBC1: It's Cliff Richard
 1 April 1971 – BBC1: Top Of The Pops
 3 April 1971 – BBC1: The Eurovision Song Contest 1971
 10 April 1971 – BBC2: The Talk Of The Town
 24 July 1971 – BBC2: The Harry Secombe Show (repeat from BBC1)
 29 July 1971 – ITV: It's Tarbuck
 16 September 1971 – BBC1: Top Of The Pops
 9 October 1971  – BBC1: Bruce Forsyth & The Generation Game
 11 November 1971 – BBC1: Top Of The Pops
 1 January 1972 – BBC1: Time For Baxter
 16 February 1972 – BBC1: Whacko!
 8 April 1972 – BBC1: Tarbuck's Luck
 20 April 1972 – BBC1: Top Of The Pops
 29 April 1972 – ITV: Saturday Variety
 13 May 1972 – ITV: The Rolf Harris Show
 31 May 1972 – ITV: Des (The Des O'Connor Show)
 26 August 1972 – ITV: Saturday Variety
 7 September 1972 – BBC2: Sacha's In Town
 3 December 1972 – ITV: The Golden Shot
 10 December 1972 – ITV: The Golden Shot
 14 December 1972 – BBC1: Top Of The Pops
 17 December 1972 – ITV: The Golden Shot
 26 December 1972 – ITV: All The Jokers – Full House
 31 December 1972 – BBC1: Top Of The Year
 1 January 1973 – BBC1: Tarbuck Follies
 10 April 1973 – ITV: It's Tarbuck
 5 May 1973 – ITV: Mike & Bernie's Show
 6 May 1973 – ITV: The Golden Shot
 9 June 1973 – BBC2: They Sold A Million
 28 June 1973 – ITV: STV Showcase
 5 August 1973 – ITV: Russell Harty Plus
 6 August 1973 – BBC2: Show Of The Week – The Young Generation Big Top
 25 December 1973 – ITV: Tommy Cooper's Christmas
 3 January 1974 – BBC2: Show Of The Week – The Two Ronnies
 24 March 1974 – ITV: Sunday Night At The London Palladium (appearance postponed from 10th January)
 11 May 1974 – BBC1: Look – Mike Yarwood
 9 June 1974 – BBC2: They Sold A Million
 11 June 1974 – ITV: The Tommy Cooper Hour
 26 July 1974 – ITV: Sez Les
 27 July 1974 – BBC1: The Two Ronnies (repeat from BBC2)
 28 December 1974 – ITV: It's Norman
 31 January 1975 – ITV: Russell Harty
 2 August 1975 – BBC1: Seaside Special
 13 December 1975 – BBC1: Seaside Special
 18 December 1976 – ITV (LWT only): Saturday Scene
 18 December 1976 – ITV: Supersonic
 6 January 1977 – BBC1: Top Of The Pops
 8 January 1977 – ITV: Celebrity Squares
 8 February 1977 – BBC2: The Musical Time Machine
 26 February 1977 – BBC1: Ronnie Corbett's Saturday Special
 19 March 1977 – BBC1: This Is Peter Morrison
 31 October 1977 – BBC2: Des O’Connor Tonight
 1 February 1978 – ITV: I'm Bob, He's Dickie
 17 March 1978 – ITV: When Irish Stars Are Smiling
 13 April 1978 – BBC1: Ronnie Corbett's Thursday Special
 18 May 1978 – BBC2: Des O’Connor Tonight (repeat from BBC2)
 25 December 1978 – ITV: 3-2-1 Christmas Special
 17 March 1979 – ITV: Stars Across The Water
 27 April 1979 – BBC1: The Ronnie Corbett Special
 27 October 1979 – BBC1: The Basil Brush Show
 14 November 1979 – ITV: London Night Out

1980s – 2020s
 12 November 1980 – ITV: London Night Out
 4 March 1981 – ITV (Granada Only): Live From Two
 22 June 1981 – ITV: Now For Nookie
 11 December 1981 – BBC1: Pebble Mill
 16 January 1982 – BBC1: The Two Ronnies
 31 March 1983 – Channel 4: Unforgettable
 3 May 1991 – BBC1: Gloria Live
 6 September 1993 – BBC1: Whatever Happened To...?
 24 April 1994 – BBC1: Biteback
 4 May 1998 – BBC2: Europigeon
 10 July 1999 – ITV: Moonshot – The Spirit Of '69
 2002 - BBC Northern Ireland: Music Asides

See also
 List of RCA Records artists
 List of performers on Top of the Pops
 List of NME covers

References

External links
 
 
 Mini biography at Irish Connections
 Transcribed interview with Kenny Young mentioning Clodagh Rodgers' work
 [ Clodagh Rodgers biography] at AllMusic website
 Billboard Magazine ad (p. 2), 21 March 1970

1947 births
Living people
Pop singers from Northern Ireland
Women singers from Northern Ireland
Eurovision Song Contest entrants for the United Kingdom
Eurovision Song Contest entrants of 1971
People from Ballymena
Decca Records artists
Columbia Records artists
RCA Records artists